Elizabeth Hunter Holt (1726-1788) was a colonial American newspaper publisher from the U.S. state of Virginia.

Biography
Elizabeth Hunter Holt was the sister of William Hunter of Yorktown, Virginia. She married John Holt (1726-1784) of Williamsburg, Virginia, whom she succeeded at the New York Journal, which for a short time was renamed the Independent New York Gazette. They had a son, John Hunter Holt (d. 1787) and a daughter, Elizabeth Oswald, who was also a publisher. In 1784, she was named New York state printer.

References

Bibliography

1726 births
1788 deaths
Women in publishing
18th-century American newspaper publishers (people)
Women printers
18th-century American businesswomen